Miriam Borgenicht (July 22, 1915 − April 23, 1992) was an American writer of mystery novels. A 1936 graduate of Barnard College in New York City, she worked for the Works Progress Administration during the Great Depression. She married Milton Klein, a lawyer, and had five children.

In addition to her novels, she wrote articles for magazines including The New Yorker, McCall's, Parents, and The New Republic. She died in Manhattan in 1992.

Critical reviews
In general, reviewers of Borgenicht's novels praised aspects of the fiction but also expressed reservations. Kirkus Reviews found Borgenicht's first novel, A Corpse in Diplomacy, "Fast paced but feminine". Pearl G. Aldrich, writing in Twentieth-Century Crime and Mystery Writers, said of Borgenicht's first 10 novels, "They tread a very thin line, each wavering back and forth from competent to inept, credible to ridiculous, interesting to boring." A reviewer for Publishers Weekly said of No Duress, "The villains will be obvious to even neophyte armchair sleuths, but Borgenicht's perceptive comments on troubling social issues generate plenty of tension." A Publishers Weekly reviewer said of Undue Influence that it was "well-crafted" and featured "strong characters" but that it lost suspense in the closing chapters via a plot twist that was "too sudden and convenient".

Bibliography
 A Corpse in Diplomacy (1949) 
 Ring and Walk in (1952) 
 Don't Look Back (1956) 
 To Borrow Trouble (1965) 
 Extreme Remedies (1967) 
 Margin for Doubt (1968) 
 The Tomorrow Trap (1969) 
 A Very Thin Line (1970) 
 Roadblock (1973) 
 No Bail for Dalton (1974) 
 True or False? (1982) 
 Bad Medicine (1984) 
 Fall from Grace (1984) 
 Still Life (1986) 
 Undue Influence (1989) 
 No Duress (1991) 
 False Colors (1985) 
 Booked for Death (1987)

References

1915 births
1992 deaths
20th-century American women writers
American mystery writers
Barnard College alumni